Ortonville School District #2903, operating as Ortonville Public School or Ortonville Public Schools, is a school district headquartered in Ortonville, Minnesota. The district is subdivided into Knoll Elementary School and Ortonville High School.

In Big Stone County it serves Ortonville and Odessa. In Lac qui Parle County it serves Bellingham.

History
In 2009 the Bellingham School District merged into the Ortonville district. Under Minnesota law it was a consolidation.

References

External links
 Ortonville Public School
Big Stone County, Minnesota
Education in Lac qui Parle County, Minnesota
School districts in Minnesota